Mile End South is a suburb of Adelaide, South Australia, in the City of West Torrens. The name, denoting an area south of Mile End, was in use as early as 1913, but was only formally adopted by the state's nomenclature committee in 1944.

References and notes

Suburbs of Adelaide